The Shimenkan Dam (石门坎) is an arch dam on the Lixian River (李仙江), straddling the border between Ning'er and Mojiang County in Yunnan Province, China. The primary purpose of the dam is hydroelectric power generation and its power station has an installed capacity of 130 MW. Construction began in 2007 and the dam was complete in 2010. It is the second dam in the Lixian River cascade.

See also

List of dams and reservoirs in China
List of major power stations in Yunnan

External links

References

Dams in China
Hydroelectric power stations in Yunnan
Arch dams
Dams completed in 2010
Dams on the Black River (Asia)
Buildings and structures in Pu'er